Mossyrock is a city in Lewis County, Washington, United States. The population was 768 at the 2020 census.

History
The Indian name for the area of Mossyrock was Coulph.

Mossyrock was officially incorporated on January 2, 1948.

Geography
Mossyrock is located at  (46.529844, -122.484269).

Demographics

2010 census
As of the census of 2010, there were 759 people, 272 households, and 196 families living in the city. The racial makeup of the city was 71.0% White, 0.1% African American, 0.8% Native American, 0.1% Asian, 25.4% from other races, and 2.5% from two or more races. Hispanic or Latino of any race were 30.8% of the population.

There were 272 households, of which 41.9% had children under the age of 18 living with them, 46.3% were married couples living together, 16.9% had a female householder with no husband present, 8.8% had a male householder with no wife present, and 27.9% were non-families. 22.4% of all households were made up of individuals, and 7.3% had someone living alone who was 65 years of age or older. The average household size was 2.79 and the average family size was 3.24.

The median age in the city was 32.9 years. 30% of residents were under the age of 18; 8.9% were between the ages of 18 and 24; 27.4% were from 25 to 44; 21.2% were from 45 to 64; and 12.5% were 65 years of age or older. The gender makeup of the city was 51.5% male and 48.5% female.

2000 census
As of the census of 2000, there were 486 people, 187 households, and 115 families living in the city. The population density was 1,112.5 people per square mile (426.5/km2). There were 215 housing units at an average density of 492.2 per square mile (188.7/km2). The racial makeup of the city was 90.3% White, 0.2% African American, 1.9% Native American, 0.2% Asian, 0.2% Pacific Islander, 3.5% from other races, and 3.7% from two or more races. Hispanic or Latino of any race were 6.8% of the population.

There were 187 households, out of which 30.5% had children under the age of 18 living with them, 43.3% were married couples living together, 13.4% had a female householder with no husband present, and 38.5% were non-families. 28.9% of all households were made up of individuals, and 12.8% had someone living alone who was 65 years of age or older. The average household size was 2.60 and the average family size was 3.20.

In the city, the population was spread out, with 29.6% under the age of 18, 11.3% from 18 to 24, 26.3% from 25 to 44, 19.3% from 45 to 64, and 13.4% who were 65 years of age or older. The median age was 32 years. For every 100 females, there were 93.6 males. For every 100 females age 18 and over, there were 102.4 males.

The median income for a household in the city was $29,750, and the median income for a family was $33,542. Males had a median income of $30,938 versus $16,250 for females. The per capita income for the city was $12,216. About 18.6% of families and 19.5% of the population were below the poverty line, including 18.9% of those under age 18 and 18.2% of those age 65 or over.

Arts and culture

Festivals and events
The city hosts an annual, three-day Blueberry Festival the first weekend of August, honoring the local blueberry farming economy.  Begun in 2006, the event's large turnout requires the entirety of Klickitat Prairie Park, with pie eating contests, farm tours, car shows and musical performances.  The Mossyrock Area Action League, who oversee and schedule the festival, gear activities toward family-friendly fare, including attention towards children's games and crafts.

Politics
Mossyrock is recognized as being majority Republican and conservative. 

The results for the 2020 U.S. Presidential Election for the Mossyrock voting district were as follows:

 Donald J. Trump (Republican) - 168 (70.29%)
 Joe Biden (Democrat) - 69 (28.87%)
 Jo Jorgensen (Libertarian) - 1 (0.42%)
 Write-in candidate - 1 (0.42%)

Notable people
 Eli Kulp, chef
 Harry R. Truman, casualty of the 1980 eruption of Mount St. Helens

References

External links
City website

Cities in Washington (state)
Cities in Lewis County, Washington